Sudlow is a surname. It may refer to:

 Bessie Sudlow (1849–1928), an English burlesque performer and opera bouffe soprano
 Cathie Sudlow, a British neurologist
 Phebe Sudlow (1831–1922), first female superintendent of a public school in the United States